Sulfoxylic acid (H2SO2) (also known as hyposulfurous acid or sulfur dihydroxide) is an unstable oxoacid of sulfur in an intermediate oxidation state between hydrogen sulfide and dithionous acid. It consists of two hydroxy groups attached to a sulfur atom. Sulfoxylic acid contains sulfur in an oxidation state of +2. Sulfur monoxide (SO) can be considered as a theoretical anhydride for sulfoxylic acid, but it is not actually known to react with water.

The complementary base is the sulfoxylate anion  which is much more stable. In between these states is the  ion, also somewhat stable. Sulfoxylate ions can be made by decomposing thiourea dioxide in an alkaline solution. To do this, thiourea dioxide first forms a tautomer, aminoiminomethanesulfinic acid (H2NC(=NH)SO2H, abbreviated AIMS) which breaks apart. Sulfoxylate reacts with formaldehyde to yield a hydroxymethanesulfinate called rongalite:
 + H2CO →  which is an important chemical for dyeing.

Formation
Sulfoxylic acid has been detected in the gas phase. It is likely to be formed as an intermediate when hydrogen sulfide is oxidised by living organisms, or in the atmosphere, or anywhere else in the natural environment. It may also exist in circumstellar disks. When H2S is oxidised it starts from oxidation state −2, and should then pass through intermediate values of 0 and +2 before getting to well known sulfite at +4 and sulfate at +6. When sulfide in alkaline conditions is oxidised by air in the presence of nickel ions, sulfoxylate concentration first increases to around 5% and then decreases over several days. Polysulfide concentration also grows and then shrinks on a slower timescale reaching about 25% of the sulfide. The sulfur ends up forming thiosulfate.

Sulfoxylic acid has been made by ultraviolet irradiation of a mixture of solid H2S and H2O, followed by warming. This is a possible natural process in comets or circumstellar disks.

Fender et al. claimed to make "sulfinic acid" (an isomer of sulfoxylic acid) by ultraviolet irradiation on solid sulfur dioxide and hydrogen sulfide in a solid argon matrix, measuring the infrared vibrational spectrum. However the assignment of the lines in the spectrum is doubtful, so this may not be the substance produced.

Sulfoxylic acid can be made in the gas phase in an electric discharge through a neon, H2, SO2 mixture. This also yields some sulfhydryl hydroperoxide.

Properties
Sulfoxylic acid is an isomer of sulfinic acid, which has a hydrogen atom bonded to the sulfur, and the oxygen connected with a double bond (HS(O)OH). Other isomers are thiadioxyrane (a ring of two oxygen atoms and a sulfur), dihydrogen sulfone (a sulfur atom linked to two hydrogen and two oxygen atoms), sulfhydryl hydroperoxide (HSOOH), and dihydrogen persulfoxide H2SOO. Sulfoxylic acid has the lowest energy of any of these isomers.

The pKa1 of sulfoxylic acid is 7.97. The pKa2 of bisulfoxylate is 13.55.

Calculations of the molecule suggest there may be two alignments termed C2, and Cs. The H−O distance is 96.22 (or 96.16) pm, S−O distance is 163.64 (or 163.67) pm, ∠HOS = 108.14° (108.59°), ∠OSO = 103.28° (103.64°) HOSO twist is 84.34° (+90.56 and −90.56) (Cs dimensions in parentheses).

The microwave spectrum has absorption lines at 10.419265, 12.2441259, 14.0223698, 16.3161779 GHz and many others for the Cs and 12.8910254, 19.4509030, 21.4709035, 24.7588445, 29.5065050, 29.5848250, 32.8772050 GHz for the C2 form.

The sulfoxylate ion apparently has an X-ray absorption near edge structure at 2476.1 eV. With sulfur the X-ray absorption edge changes with oxidation state as per Kunzl's law. The edge corresponds to the energy needed to excite and inner 1S electron to a 3P orbital. Sulfoxylate has an infrared absorption peak at 918.2 cm−1.

Reactions
Sulfoxylic acid disproportionates into sulfur and hydrogensulfite . Some of this in turn reacts to form thiosulfate .

Sulfoxylates are sensitive to air, and will be oxidised by the oxygen in it.

Sulfoxylate is oxidised to sulfur dioxide radical anion and then to sulfur dioxide.

 + O2 →  + 
 + O2 → SO2 + 
2    (dithionite)

The known sulfoxylate salts include cobalt sulfoxylate CoSO2·3H2O. This can dissolve in an ammoniacal solution. However cobalt sulfide will precipitate if sulfide is formed during a reaction.

Sulfoxylate in solution reacts with thiosulfate to form sulfides and sulfites.

Sulfoxylate reduces nitrite to hydronitrite radical dianion . This in turn reacts with water forming hydroxide ions and nitric oxide (NO). Nitric oxide and nitrous oxide N2O in turn are further reduced by sulfoxylate.

When sulfoxylate reacts with hypochlorite, bromine or chlorine dioxide it forms hydrogen sulfite and sulfates.

Dithionite is unstable in a pH 4 solution, decomposing to sulfoxylic acid and hydrogen sulfite.  This sulfoxylic acid reacts with more dithionite to yield more hydrogen sulfite, and some kind of sulfur, and a small amount of thiosulfate.

 + H+ → H2SO2 + 
 + H2SO2 → 2  + S
 + H2SO2 →  +  + H+

By reducing sulfur dioxide, hydrogen sulfoxylate forms as an intermediate, and this is much more reactive. Hydrogen sulfoxylate reacts with organic compounds with a double bond (vinyls) to make an organic sulfinate.  Hydrogen sulfoxylate reacts with divinyl sulfone to make 1,4-dithiane 1,1,4,4-tetroxide. Perfluorophenyl iodide is reduced to pentafluorobenzene.

The reaction of sulfoxylic acid with sulfite yields trithionate and with thiosulfate yields pentathionate.

Salts
Salts of sulfoxylic acid that have been claimed to have been made include cobalt, thallium and zinc. Cobalt sulfoxylate is made from sodium hyposulfite, cobalt chloride and ammonia. Zinc sulfoxylate is produced by reacting zinc metal with sulfuryl chloride. Thallous sulfoxylate is made by allowing oxygen onto thallous sulfide. This is olive brown in colour. When heated to 250 °C it recrystallizes to another yellow form. Cuprous sufoxylate Cu2SO2 can be made as a solid or liquid by heating cuprous sulfide and copper sulfate.

Derivatives
Organic derivatives of sulfoxylic acid exist, including 1-hydroxysulfanyloxy-4-methylbenzene, and S(OCH3)2 and S(OCH2CH3)2. Naming for substances with the −OSOH group, can use suffixes -oxysulfanol (preferred), -hydrogen sulfoxylate, or -oxysulfenic acid; or prefix hydroxysulfanyloxy- (preferred) or sulfenooxy-. The ionic group -OSO− can use the preferred suffix -oxysulfanolate  or -sulfoxylate; or preferred prefix oxysulfanolato- or sulfenatooxy-. The R-OSO-R' can be suffixed with -dioxysulfane or -sulfoxylate; or prefixed with oxysulfanyloxy- or sulfenooxy-.

A reaction with sulfur dichloride with saturated primary or secondary alcohols yields a diarylsulfoxylate ROSOR compound. With 1,2 diols, SCl2 forms polymeric sulfoxylates. This method also produces dialkoxydisulfes and dialylsulfites. The yield of sulfoxylates is maximised by doing the reaction at low temperatures around -75 °C, and diluting the reactants, reducing free chlorine and disulfur dichloride production. Diethylsulfoxylate can be made by reacting diethoxydisulfide with sodium ethoxide. Other sulfoxylate esters include propyl, isopropyl, n-butyl, n-pentyl and cholesterol. Unsaturated or aromatic alcohols do not react with SCl2 to form sulfoxylates. For 1,3-diols SCl2 reaction can result in a six-member 1,3,2-dioxathiane ring or a twelve membered cyclic dimer sulfoxylate ring or even larger rings and polymers.

Sulfoxylic acid dimethyl ester (also called dimethylsulfoxylate or dimethoxysulfane) (S(OCH3)2) has been studied using electron diffraction, X-ray crystallography, Raman spectroscopy, and infrared spectroscopy. Studying this molecule is much easier than the unstable sulfoxylic acid. It is a liquid at standard conditions that boils at 74 °C and freezes at -67° In the gas state the molecular bond angle ∠OSO is 103°, with the oxygen-sulfur distance 1.625 Å. The oxygen-carbon distance is 1.426 Å and carbon-hydrogen distance 1.105 Å with ∠COS 115.9° and ∠COS 109°. The molecule as C2 symmetry with one methyl group rotated above the plane determined by the OSO atoms, and the other below. The C−O−S−O dihedral angle is about 84°. The energy barrier to moving one methyl group to the other side of the plane is 37 kJ/mol and it would be in a 12 kJ/mol higher energy state in this Cs symmetry state.

References

Extra reading

Sulfur(II) compounds
Sulfur oxoacids